Niki Volou Football Club is a Greek professional football club based in the city of Volos, in the region of Magnesia, Greece. The club currently competes in the Super League 2, the second tier of Greek football.

History
Niki Volou was founded on 19 August 1924 as Gymnastic Club of Volos' Refugees or Refugee Gymnastic Association, by Greek refugees who came from Asia Minor.

Niki participated for the first time in the championship of the first category before the establishment of the First National, as in 1953–54 she was the winner of the Northern Group and this gave her the ticket for the final phase of the National Division Championship 1953–54, Six teams (Athens (2) – Piraeus – Thessaloniki – North – South) took the 5th place with 16 points, ahead of Panahaiki, who finished the championship with 13.

Niki won for the first time in the 1961 Greek FCA Winners' Championship, where she had 5 appearances in the big league. In 1966 it was devalued to the Beta Ethniki and since then it has been trying to regain its rise to the big category, which eventually succeeded 48 years later, in 2014–15. In 1976 he won the Amateur Cup.

In recent years he has been fighting in the Beta Ethniki Championship and in the 2006–07 season he finished last and deferred to the Third National. In the 2012–13 season he was back in the Beta Ethniki Championship, and in the following year (2013–14) after the play-offs he won the first place that led to the Super League after 48 years of absence. Unfortunately, on 10 December 2014, the club of Thessaly left the championship due to the inability of the administration to cover the financial obligations that had been created, leaving all the players that belonged to its staff to be released as free. From 2015 he competes in the Gamma Ethniki.

Crest and colours

Niki Volos crest displays the goddess Nike as depicted in the statue Winged Victory of Samothrace. The image of the goddess was the original emblem of the Smyrna-based athletic club Panionios, one of the most popular Greek athletic clubs of Ionia, before it was uprooted and re-established in Athens after the Greco-Turkish War. The founding members of Niki Volou FC, many of them refugees from Smyrna (now Izmir) and the surrounding region, decided to restore the emblem as part of their new club.

Players

Current squad

Honours

Leagues 
Greek FCA Winners' Championship
Winners (1): 1960–61
Second Division
Winners (1): 2013–14
Runners-up (1): 1979–80 
Third Division
Winners (2): 1976, 1995–96
Runners-up (4): 1987–88, 2011–12, 2017–18, 2018–19
Fourth Division
Winners (2): 1992–93, 2001–02
 Greek Football Amateur Cup
 Winner (1): 1975–76
Thessaly FCA Championship
Winners (15): 1932–33, 1937–38, 1945–46, 1947–48, 1948–59, 1949–50, 1950–51, 1952–53, 1953–54, 1955–56, 1956–57, 1957–58, 1959–60, 1960–61, 1975–76
Thessaly FCA Cup
Winners (5): 1975–76, 2000–01, 2001–02, 2015–16, 2017–18

Achievements

Leagues 
Panhellenic Championship
Fifth place (1): 1954

Cups 
Greek Cup
Semi-finals (2): 1946–47, 1964-65
Quarter-Finalists (6): 1955–56, 1956–57, 1958–59, 1959–60, 1962–63, 2005–06

Seasons in the 21st century 

Key: 1R = First Round, 2R = Second Round, 3R = Third Round, 4R = Fourth Round, 5R = Fifth Round, GS = Group Stage, QF = Quarter-finals, SF = Semi-finals.

Supporters
The club's most famous supporters group is the one consisting of members from "Blue Club", fan club established in 1985, the so-called Indians. The fan club is also recognized as "Blue Club Panagiotis Ntokouzis", named after one of the founding members of the fan club who died in a motorcycle accident. Another club, particularly famous among the majority of Greek ultras, is the "Blue Angels club 1994" established in 1994. Leader of supporters is Nickolay “Nikolaykata” Kunchovski.

Notable supporters 
 Lavrentis Machairitsas, rock musician

Friendships 
 Dunav Ruse
 Astana

Sponsorships
Great Shirt Sponsor: Car.gr
Official Sport Clothing Manufacturer: Macron
Golden Sponsor: TBA

References

External links
Official website 

 
Football clubs in Thessaly
Magnesia
Sport in Volos
Association football clubs established in 1924
1924 establishments in Greece
Multi-sport clubs in Greece
Super League Greece 2 clubs